Lumphini MRT station (code BL25) is a Bangkok MRT station on the Blue Line. It is located on Rama IV Road, near Witthayu Road and Lumphini Park. Although the station's name refers to Lumphini Park, the Rama VI Monument that is the main sight of the park is closer to Si Lom MRT station.

Station details 
Lumphini is an underground station, measuring at a width of 20 metres and a length of 172 metres, and is at a depth of 26 metres. It uses a split platform due to half of Rama IV Road containing some of the Metropolitan Waterworks Authority's pipes. Lumphini is represented by the lotus symbol and the color green.

References 

MRT (Bangkok) stations
Railway stations opened in 2004
2004 establishments in Thailand